Kristian Tuohilampi (born November 8, 1989) is a Finnish ice hockey defenceman who is currently playing for the HIFK Helsinki of the SM-liiga.

References

External links 
 

HIFK (ice hockey) players
Finnish ice hockey defencemen
Living people
1989 births
Ice hockey people from Helsinki